STS-55, or Deutschland 2 (D-2), was the 55th overall flight of the NASA Space Shuttle and the 14th flight of Shuttle Columbia. This flight was a multinational Spacelab flight involving 88 experiments from eleven different nations. The experiments ranged from biology sciences to simple Earth observations.

Crew

Backup crew

Mission highlights 
Columbia carried to orbit the second reusable German Spacelab D-2 and demonstrated the shuttle's ability for international cooperation, exploration, and scientific research in space. The Spacelab module and an exterior experiment support structure contained in Columbias payload bay comprised the Spacelab D-2 payload. The first German Spacelab flight, D-1, flew Shuttle mission STS-61-A in October 1985. The United States and Germany gained valuable experience for future space station operations.

The D-2 mission, as it was commonly called, augmented the German microgravity research program started by the D-1 mission. The German Aerospace Center (DLR) had been tasked by the German Space Agency (DARA - Deutsche Agentur für Raumfahrtangelegenheiten) to conduct the second mission. DLR, NASA, the European Space Agency (ESA), and agencies in France and Japan contributed to D-2's scientific program. Eleven nations participated in the experiments. Of the 88 experiments conducted on the D-2 mission, four were sponsored by NASA.

The crew worked in two shifts around-the-clock to complete investigations into the areas of fluid physics, materials sciences, life sciences, biological sciences, technology, Earth observations, atmospheric physics, and astronomy. Many of the experiments advanced the research of the D-1 mission by conducting similar tests, using upgraded processing hardware, or implementing methods that took full advantage of the technical advancements since 1985. The D-2 mission also contained several new experiments which were not previously flown on the D-1 mission.

The mission surpassed the 365th day in space for the Space Shuttle fleet and the 100th day of flight time in space for Columbia, the fleet's oldest Space Shuttle orbiter, on its fourteenth flight.

D-2 marked the first telerobotic capture of a free floating object by flight controllers in Germany. The crew conducted the first intravenous saline solution injection in space as part of an experiment to study the human body's response to direct fluid replacement as a countermeasure for amounts lost during space flight. They also successfully completed an in-flight maintenance procedure for collection of orbiter waste water, which allowed the mission to continue.

STS-55 crew members participated in two amateur radio experiments, SAREX II from the United States and the German SAFEX. These experiments allowed students and amateur radio operators from around the world to talk directly with the Space Shuttle in orbit and participated in a SpaceMedicine conference with the Mayo Clinic.

Launch 
Columbia was initially scheduled to launch in late February 1993. However, this date slipped to early March 1993 due to concerns with the tip-seal retainers in the main engines' oxidizer turbopumps. All three turbopumps were replaced at the pad but later inspection revealed the retainers to be in good condition. Further delays were caused by the burst of a hydraulic flex hose in the aft compartment during the Flight Readiness Test (FRT). The lines were removed and inspected and three replacements were installed.

See also 

 List of human spaceflights
 List of Space Shuttle missions
 Outline of space science
 Space Shuttle
 Space Shuttle abort modes

References

External links 
 NASA mission summary 
 STS-55 Video Highlights 
 NASA STS-55 official photo gallery

Space Shuttle missions
Edwards Air Force Base
Spacecraft launched in 1993
Space programme of Germany